The Serbian Ice Hockey Association (Serbian Savez hokeja na ledu Srbije, Савез хокеја на леду Србије) is the governing body and member of the International Ice Hockey Federation (IIHF) that oversees ice hockey in Serbia. The IIHF recognizes the Yugoslavia, which joined in 1939, as the predecessor to Serbia, which officially became a member in 2007.

References

External links
Serbia at IIHF.com

Ice hockey in Serbia
Ice hockey
International Ice Hockey Federation members
Ice hockey governing bodies in Europe
1939 establishments in Yugoslavia